Siamenoside is a cucurbitane, a natural sweetener from the fruit of Siraitia grosvenorii combined with neomogroside. The mixture is about 300 times sweeter than sucrose. It is used as a natural sweetener in China.

See also 
 Mogroside, related compounds also found in S. grosvenorii.

References

External links

Triterpene glycosides
Sugar substitutes